Maxime Richard (born 14 April 1988, Dinant) is a Belgian sprint canoeist. At the 2012 Summer Olympics, he competed in the Men's K-1 200 metres.

References

Belgian male canoeists
Living people
Olympic canoeists of Belgium
Canoeists at the 2012 Summer Olympics
1988 births
People from Dinant
Sportspeople from Namur (province)